Kiril Metkov (born 1 February 1965) is a former Bulgarian professional footballer who played as an attacking midfielder.

He started his domestic football career in 1983, and during his career played for Lokomotiv Sofia, CSKA Sofia, Gamba Osaka and Slavia Sofia, before retiring in 1995.

Club statistics

National team statistics

Honours

Club
CSKA Sofia
Bulgarian League: 1991–92
Bulgarian Cup: 1992–93

References

External links
 

1965 births
Living people
Bulgarian footballers
Bulgaria international footballers
Bulgarian expatriate footballers
FC Lokomotiv 1929 Sofia players
PFC CSKA Sofia players
Gamba Osaka players
PFC Slavia Sofia players
First Professional Football League (Bulgaria) players
J1 League players
Expatriate footballers in Japan
Bulgarian expatriate sportspeople in Japan
Association football midfielders